Karsen Leung (born April 21, 1990, in Victoria, British Columbia) is a professional indoor lacrosse transition who played for the Calgary Roughnecks in the National Lacrosse League, wearing #21. He played for Bellarmine University of ECAC Lacrosse League in college.

Leung was named to the 2014 NLL All-Rookie team.  He is a finalist for the 2015 National Lacrosse League Transition Player of the Year Award, along with Joey Cupido and Brodie Merrill.

Statistics

NLL
Reference:

References

1990 births
Living people
Calgary Roughnecks players
Canadian lacrosse players
Lacrosse transitions
Sportspeople from Victoria, British Columbia